Kenny Woods (born October 22, 1969 in Los Angeles) is an American composer, producer, and musician. 
He has performed with various musical acts including: Beck, that dog, The Steven McDonald Group, and Old Hickory.

In the early 1990s, he worked in live music production and toured the world with various rock groups including, Melvins, Nirvana, Sonic Youth, Beck, Pavement, Hole, Redd Kross, and more. Shortly thereafter, Beck asked him to play guitar, but this union was short-lived when he left to form his own group Old Hickory, a musical outfit at the center of the once burgeoning Silver Lake indie rock scene. In 1999, he began playing with various bands and musicians around East L.A., including his longtime friend Rob Zabrecky, Adam Siegel (The Blondes), Anna Waronker, Joey Waronker, and Josh Schwartz (Beachwood Sparks, Further, Painted Hills). Later he formed the pastoral folk group Anders & Woods with singer/songwriter Tiffany Anders.

For more than a decade, he owned and operated Bright Street Recorders where he produced music and ran recording sessions for acts including: Sia, Death Cab For Cutie, Ancestors, Imaad Wasif, Robyn Hitchcock, Lucinda Williams, Ben Harper, Lykke Li, Lord Heron, Nite Jewel, Julian Casablancas, Vampire Weekend, Fools Gold, Ricki Lee Jones, M Ward.

In the early 2000s, he worked as a music editor for friend and composer Jon Brion, which had a huge impact on him musically and would ultimately lead to his career in music for TV and film, beginning with HBO's Flight of The Conchords where he served as a producer. Later that year he worked on various film and TV projects including Twilight, Parks and Recreation and Crossing Jordan.

More recently, he has scored, arranged, and produced music for two films, Horror, starring Chloe Sevigny and Baked In Brooklyn, starring Josh Brener and Alexandra Daddario.

Kenny currently lives in Los Feliz, CA with his wife, Stacey Woods, Esquire columnist and former Daily Show With Jon Stewart correspondent.

References

External links
 
 kennyawoods'' website

1969 births
American film score composers
Living people
Musicians from Los Angeles
21st-century American composers
American male film score composers
21st-century American male musicians